Lee Bains & The Glory Fires (sometimes stylized Lee Bains III & The Glory Fires) are an American alternative rock/Southern rock band, formed in 2011 in Birmingham, Alabama. 

Their debut album, There is a Bomb in Gilead was released on Alive Records in 2012. The band followed that with Dereconstructed, released on Sub Pop Records in 2014.

In 2017, their third album Youth Detention///(Nail My Feet to the Southside of Town) was released by Don Giovanni Records. That November the band recorded a live album over two nights of shows at the Nick, released by Don Giovanni as Live at the Nick in 2018.

Discography

Studio albums

Live albums

EPs

References

External links
 
 Lee Bains & The Glory Fires at Don Giovanni Records

Musical groups established in 2011
Musical groups from Alabama
Don Giovanni Records artists
Birmingham, Alabama
American southern rock musical groups